The 1837 United Kingdom general election was triggered by the death of King William IV and produced the first Parliament of the reign of his successor, Queen Victoria. It saw Robert Peel's Conservatives close further on the position of the Whigs, who won their fourth election of the decade.

The election marked the last time that a Parliament was dissolved as a result of the demise of the Crown. The dissolution of Parliament six months after a demise of the Crown, as provided for by the Succession to the Crown Act 1707, was abolished by the Reform Act 1867.

Results

|}

Voting summary

Seats summary

Regional results

Great Britain

England

Scotland

Wales

Ireland

Universities

References

External links
 Spartacus: Political Parties and Election Results

 
1837 elections in the United Kingdom
General election
1837
July 1837 events
August 1837 events
1830s elections in Ireland